The 2017 Taupo TRS round was the fourth round of the 2017 Toyota Racing Series. The event was held at the Bruce McLaren Motorsport Park, in Taupo, New Zealand from 4 to 5 February 2017.

Report

Practice 
Thomas Randle continued his front-running form by achieving the fastest time in four out of the five practice sessions during the weekend. The only other driver to top the timesheets during practice was Marcus Armstrong, who went fastest in Practice Four.

Race 1

Qualifying 
Armstrong grabbed his first Toyota Racing Series pole position with a time of 1:23.383, with Jehan Daruvala in second and Brendon Leitch in third.

Race 
A strong start followed by fast, consistent race pace meant that Leitch would grab his first race win of the year. Armstrong finished second and Daruvala third.

Race 2 
Pedro Piquet held off a rampant Thomas Randle to take his second win of the year, with Daruvala in third.

Race 3

Qualifying

Race

References

Taupo TRS round
Taupo TRS round